Earl Crawford is Child ballad 229, part of a collection of 305 ballads compiled by Francis James Child and published between 1882 and 1898.

Synopsis
Earl and Lillie Crawford, a married couple, had a son. Lillie began to complain that Earl spent more time doting upon their son more than he does her. He becomes angry when he hears this, and he sends his wife to live with her father. Lillie's father appeals, but Earl is steadfast. Eral says he will not take Lillie back into his home. When Lillie received this news it is said that she died of heartache. Earl then hears of his wife's passing and dies of heartache as well. Earl and Lillie's son is left all alone.

External links
Earl Crawford

Child Ballads
Crawford
Songwriter unknown
Year of song unknown